Sharp On All 4 Corners: Corner 2 is the twenty second studio album by American rapper E-40. The album was released on December 9, 2014, by Heavy on the Grind Entertainment. The album features guest appearances from  B-Legit, Mack 10, Turf Talk, Dej Loaf, Ludacris, Kirko Bangz, Plies, Ty Dolla Sign and others.

Sharp On All 4 Corners: Corner 1 was released the same day as this album, but as of 2022, Corner 3 and Corner 4 have not seen a release.

Reception
The album debuted at number 197 on Billboard 200, and No. 12 on the Top Rap Albums chart, selling 6,000 copies in its first week. It has sold 35,000 copies as of November 2016.

Track listing

Charts

References

2014 albums
E-40 albums
Albums produced by Droop-E
Albums produced by Mike Free
Albums produced by Rick Rock
Sequel albums